Penryn West is an electoral division of Cornwall in the United Kingdom and returns one member to sit on Cornwall Council. The current Councillor is Mary May, an Independent and the vice-chairman of the council.

Extent
Penryn West covers the centre and west of the town of Penryn, including Penryn College. The division covers 164 hectares in total.

Election results

2017 election

2013 election

2009 election

References

Penryn, Cornwall
Electoral divisions of Cornwall Council